Bluff Springs is an unincorporated community in Cass County, Illinois, United States. Bluff Springs is located on Illinois Route 125, east of Beardstown.

References

Unincorporated communities in Cass County, Illinois
Unincorporated communities in Illinois